Paralepista is a genus of mushrooms in family Tricholomataceae.  Until 2012, its member species were generally assigned either to Lepista or to Clitocybe.

Naming history
There have long been differing opinions as to how mushrooms which were assigned to genus Lepista (sometimes also placed in genus Clitocybe) should be classified.  The fungi in question all have a white or slightly pink/yellow spore print, finely warty spores, and easily separable gills.  In 1981 Jörg H. Raithelhuber identified as separate a subgroup having very crowded strongly decurrent gills and spores which are oval in section to almost spherical, including Lepista flaccida and Lepista gilva.  He proposed this subgroup as a new genus Paralepista.  In the following years it was recognized at the level of a subgenus (also called "Lepista section Inversae" or "Lepista sect. Gilva), but not as a genus.

Then in 2012 Alfredo Vizzini and Enrico Ercole published a paper which confirmed by DNA sequencing analysis that these mushrooms are a separate clade from other parts of Lepista and Clitocybe.  The paper includes a detailed phylogram covering relevant species.  Accordingly Vizzini again put forward Raithelhuber's name Paralepista at the genus level, together with a list of the species names which should belong to the genus.  The new genus is recognized by Species Fungorum, and the Global Biodiversity Information Facility.

Definition of the genus

Paralepista shares the following characteristics with Lepista.
A Clitocybe-like general shape.
A white or slightly pink/yellow spore print.
Spores with fine warts or spines.

The following features distinguish Paralepista from other Lepista fungi.
Gills which are very crowded and strongly decurrent.
Spores with oval cross-section (elongated to almost spherical).

Principal species
See Vizzini and Species Fungorum for a complete list of species.  "Basionym year" means the date of the original description of the species under its present specific name, whichever genus it belonged to at the time.

References

Links

Tricholomataceae